II. documenta was the second edition of documenta,  a quinquennial contemporary art exhibition. It was held between 11 July and 1 October 1959 in Kassel, West Germany. The artistic director was Arnold Bode in collaboration with art historian Werner Haftmann.

Participants

References 

Documenta 2
1959 in Germany
1959 in art